São Mateus is a monorail of São Paulo Metro. It belongs to Line 15-Silver, which is currently in expansion, and should go to Cidade Tiradentes, connecting with Line 2-Green in Vila Prudente. It is located in Avenida Sapopemba, 13542.

It was first scheduled, according to the Expansion Plan of the Government of the State of São Paulo, to be opened in the first semester of 2020. Later, it was officially opened on 16 December 2019 along with stations Sapopemba and Fazenda da Juta.

Station layout

References

São Paulo Metro stations
Railway stations opened in 2019